Nyota is a given name.  It means star in the African languages Swahili and Lingala.

People, animals, companies and fictional characters with this name include:
 Nyota Inyoka (1896–1971), French-Indian dancer and choreographer
 Nyota Ndogo, Kenyan musician 
 Nyota (Bonobo), male Bonobo born at the Language Research Center at Georgia State University 
 Nyota Uhura, fictional Communications Officer in the original series of Star Trek
 Nyota, wedding invitation and accessories manufacturer and exporter

References

African given names
Swahili words and phrases